The island leopard frog or Little Corn Island frog (Lithobates miadis, also commonly known as Rana miadis) is a species of frogs in the family Ranidae, endemic to Little Corn Island off the Caribbean coast of Nicaragua. It is locally known as rana leopardo isleña.

This species inhabits the tropical lowland rainforests of Little Corn Island. It is expected that the expanding tourist industry would lead to habitat loss to this species.

References

Lithobates
Amphibians of Nicaragua
Endemic fauna of Nicaragua
Amphibians described in 1929
Taxonomy articles created by Polbot